The Nanfengmiju (Citrus reticulata,) is a rare non-hybrid citrus.

A small, sweet fruit, it is one of the most widely cultivated varieties of mandarin orange in China. It is thought to be a descendant of the Tang and Song dynasty ruju, and related to the Japanese kishu, which is now also grown and sold in North America.

References

Citrus
Agriculture in China